This is a list of singles that have peaked in the top 10 of the French Singles Chart in 2012.

Top 10 singles

2011 peaks

2013 peaks

See also 
 2012 in music
 List of number-one hits of 2012 (France)

Notes 
  - The single re-entered the Top 10 on the week ending 19 February 2012.
  - The single re-entered the Top 10 on the week ending 8 April 2012.
  - The single re-entered the Top 10 on the week ending 20 May 2012.
  - The single re-entered the Top 10 on the week ending 27 May 2012.
  - The single re-entered the Top 10 on the week ending 3 June 2012.
  - The single re-entered the Top 10 on the week ending 8 July 2012.
  - The single re-entered the Top 10 on the week ending 12 August 2012.
  - The single re-entered the Top 10 on the week ending 19 August 2012.
  - The single re-entered the Top 10 on the week ending 16 September 2012.
  - The single re-entered the Top 10 on the week ending 21 October 2012.
  - The single re-entered the Top 10 on the week ending 28 October 2012.
  - The single re-entered the Top 10 on the week ending 2 December 2012.
  - The single re-entered the Top 10 on the week ending 9 December 2012.

External links 
 LesCharts.com

Top
France
Top 10 singles in 2012
France 2012